Indiana's 4th congressional district is a congressional district in the U.S. state of Indiana. From 2003 to 2013 the district was based primarily in the central part of the state, and consisted of all of Boone, Clinton, Hendricks, Morgan, Lawrence, Montgomery, and Tippecanoe counties and parts of Fountain, Johnson, Marion, Monroe, and White counties. The district surrounded Indianapolis including the suburban area of Greenwood and encompassed the more exurban areas of Crawfordsville and Bedford, as well as the college town of Lafayette-West Lafayette, containing Purdue University.

From the 2012 redistricting, the district shifted slightly north and west to include the Illinois border, while losing the eastern Indianapolis suburbs.  It currently includes Crawfordsville, Lafayette, the western Indianapolis suburbs, and portions of Kokomo.

The district is currently represented by Republican Jim Baird, who succeeded Todd Rokita, who vacated his House seat to run for the Indiana U.S. Senate seat held by Democrat Joe Donnelly, losing the Republican nomination to eventual senator Mike Braun. Baird was elected on November 6.

Geography

Prior to the 2000 U.S. Census, most of the territory currently in the 4th Congressional District was located in the 7th Congressional District; the old 4th Congressional District was the Fort Wayne district, which is now the 3rd Congressional District.

Composition

As of 2023, Indiana's 4th congressional district is located in western Indiana. It includes Benton, Boone, Carroll, Clinton, Hendricks, Jasper, Montgomery, Morgan, Newton, Putnam, Tippecanoe, Warren, and White Counties in full, as well as parts of Cass and Fountain Counties, and one township from Howard County.

Cass County is split between this district and the 2nd district. They are partitioned roughly by Indiana S Co Rd 200E, Indiana S Co Rd 500E, Indiana N Co Rd 50E, and Indiana N Co Rd 600W. The 4th district takes in most of the city of Logansport, and the 5 townships of Boone, Clinton, Eel, Jefferson, Noble, Washington, and part of the township of Deer Creek.

Fountain County is split between this district and the 8th district. They are partitioned on the western border by Indiana State Rt 32, East Prairie Chapel Rd, and South New Liberty Rd, and on the southeastern border by North Sandhill Rd, Indiana West 260N, North Portland Arch Rd, West County Home Rd, and Indiana West 450N. The 4th district takes in the cities of Attica, Hillsboro, Mellott, and Newton, and the 3 townships of Davis, Logan, and Richland, most of the township of Cain and Troy.

Howard County is mostly within the 5th district, with part of the city of Russiaville and the township of Honey Creek. The county is partitioned by Indiana County Rd S 750 West, East Main St, and Indiana County Rd S 650 West.

Election results from presidential races

List of members representing the district

Election results

2002

2004

2006

2008

2010

2012

2014

2016

2018

2020

2022

Historical district boundaries

See also

Indiana's congressional districts
List of United States congressional districts

References

 Congressional Biographical Directory of the United States 1774–present

04
Boone County, Indiana
Clinton County, Indiana
Fountain County, Indiana
Hendricks County, Indiana
Johnson County, Indiana
Lawrence County, Indiana
Marion County, Indiana
Monroe County, Indiana
Morgan County, Indiana
Montgomery County, Indiana
Tippecanoe County, Indiana
White County, Indiana
Constituencies established in 1833
1833 establishments in Indiana
Dan Quayle